The Whitefish River is a river in southeastern Yukon, Canada and is in the Mackenzie River and Arctic Ocean drainage basins.

References

Rivers of Yukon